Natural Language & Linguistic Theory is a quarterly peer-reviewed academic journal covering theoretical and generative linguistics. It was established in 1983 and originally published by Kluwer Academic Publishers. Since 2004 the journal is published by Springer Science+Business Media. The editor-in-chief is Julie Anne Legate (University of Pennsylvania).

The journal carries a "Topic-Comment" column (initiated by Geoffrey K. Pullum), in which a contributor presents a personal, sometimes controversial, opinion on some aspect of the field.

Abstracting and indexing
The journal is abstracted and indexed in:

According to the Journal Citation Reports, the journal has a 2015 impact factor of 0.845.

References

External links

Linguistics journals
Springer Science+Business Media academic journals
English-language journals
Quarterly journals
Publications established in 1983